William Gunn (4 March 1932 – 23 March 1991) was an Australian rules footballer who played with South Melbourne in the Victorian Football League (VFL) during the 1950s.

A half-forward flanker, Gunn finished equal fifth in the 1958 Brownlow Medal and was a regular Victorian interstate representative. He captained South Melbourne for the 1955 VFL season, topping their goal-kicking the following season with 28 goals.

Gunn is the grandfather of former Western Bulldogs player and  captain Callan Ward.

References

External links

1932 births
Sydney Swans players
Williamstown Football Club players
Australian rules footballers from Victoria (Australia)
1991 deaths